Violet is the third studio album by Polish gothic rock band Closterkeller. It was released on September, 1993 in Poland through Izabelin Studio. The album was recorded at Izabelin Studio from April to September, 1993. The cover art was created by Marta Dziubalska and Łukasz Dziubalski.

Track listing

Bonus Tracks

Personnel
 Anja Orthodox - vocal, lyrics
 Paweł Pieczyński - guitar
 Krzysztof Najman - bass
 Piotr Pawłowski - drums
 Michał Rollinger - keyboards
Zbigniew Bieniak - backing vocals
Violetta "Fiolka" Najdenowicz - backing vocals
Music - Closterkeller.

Music videos
 "Agnieszka" (1993)
 "W moim kraju" (1993)
 "Babeluu" (1994)
 "Supernova" (1994)

Release history

References

1993 albums
Closterkeller albums
Polish-language albums